Kala Gavabar, also known as Kalakavar, may refer to:
 Bala Kala Gavabar
 Pain Kala Gavabar